Daniela Oltean (born July 24, 1980, in Cluj-Napoca, Cluj County) is a Romanian long track speed skater who participates in international competitions.

Personal records

Tournament summary

Source:

References

External links
 Oltean at Jakub Majerski's Speedskating Database
 Oltean at SkateResults.com

1980 births
Living people
Romanian female speed skaters
Speed skaters at the 2002 Winter Olympics
Speed skaters at the 2006 Winter Olympics
Olympic speed skaters of Romania
Sportspeople from Cluj-Napoca